Pachnoda impressa, the green and yellow fruit chafer, is a species of beetles of the family Scarabaeidae and subfamily Cetoniinae.

Description
Basic color is greenish-brown, with yellow-orange markings on the elytra.

Distribution
This species can be found in Malawi, South Africa, Zambia and Tanzania. It is quite common in the equatorial African bush.

References
 Biolib
 YouTube

Cetoniinae
Beetles described in 1805